John Elsom (born 10 August 1939) is an English association football former football chairman and club director who is currently the club president of Grimsby Town. He is the former chairman of Leicester City and has served on the board of the Football League and is a member of the Football Association (FA) Council.

Business
Elsom was the former chairman of the Page and Moy Travel group.

Football

Leicester City
Elsom was chairman of Leicester City F.C. from 1998 until mid-2002. During his tenure as chairman the club finished in mid-table in the Premier League, took part in the 1999 and 2000 League Cup Finals, and competed in the UEFA Cup. He also gave them a new stadium, the 32,000-seat Walkers Stadium, which opened for the 2002-03 season as a replacement for 111-year-old Filbert Street. However, his chairmanship of the club came to an end after the 2001-02 season when the Foxes had been relegated from the Premier League and were more than £30million in debt.

Grimsby Town
He was co-opted onto the board of directors of Grimsby Town Football Club in December 2002. Elsom stepped down and retired from his role 8 August 2013 and in turn was appointed club president.

Personal life
Elsom's family come from Brigg, North Lincolnshire.

References

1939 births
Living people
Leicester City F.C. directors and chairmen
English football chairmen and investors
Grimsby Town F.C. non-playing staff